Phycomorpha prasinochroa is a moth in the Copromorphidae family. It is found in Australia, where it has been recorded from New South Wales and Queensland.

The forewings are green with brown flecks. The hindwings are a shiny grey.

The larvae feed on the buds and new growth of various Ficus species, including Ficus fraseri, Ficus coronata and Ficus carica.

References

Natural History Museum Lepidoptera generic names catalog

Copromorphidae
Moths described in 1906